Boxing competitions at the 2019 Pan American Games in Lima are scheduled to be held between July 27th and August 2nd, 2019 at the Miguel Grau Coliseum in the Villa Deportiva Regional del Callao cluster.

The competition is split among 15 events, 10 for men and five for women. In 2016, the International Olympic Committee (IOC) made several changes to its sports program, which were subsequently implemented for these games. Included in this was the addition of two additional women's boxing events.

Medal table

Medallists

Men

Women

 Jessica Caicedo of  originally won the gold medal, but was disqualified for doping violations.

Qualification

A total of 120 boxers will qualify to compete at the games (eight per event). The host nation (Peru) received up to seven automatic qualification spots (five men and two women). The remainder of the spots were awarded at the Pan American Games qualifier held in Managua, Nicaragua in April 2019.

See also
Boxing at the 2020 Summer Olympics

References

External links
Results book

 
Boxing
Pan American Games
2019